György Nagy (born 2 January 1965 in Budapest) is a Hungarian male curler.

On international level he is runner-up of 2009 World Mixed Doubles Curling Championship and bronze medallist of 2013 European Mixed Curling Championship.

On national level he is nine-time Hungarian men's curling champion (2003, 2004, 2005, 2006, 2008, 2011, 2012, 2015, 2016), six-time Hungarian mixed curling champion (2005, 2008, 2011, 2013, 2014, 2015), five-time Hungarian mixed doubles curling champion (2007, 2008, 2010, 2011, 2017), seven-time Hungarian Men's Curler of the Year (2005, 2007, 2009, 2011, 2013, 2014, 2018).

Teams and events

Men's

Mixed

Mixed doubles

References

External links

1965 births
Living people
Hungarian male curlers
Hungarian curling champions
Sportspeople from Budapest